Peter Nicholas Boulware (born December 18, 1974) is an American former professional football player who was a linebacker in the National Football League (NFL) for nine seasons.  He played college football for Florida State University, and was recognized as an All-American.  A first-round pick of the Baltimore Ravens in the 1997 NFL Draft, he played his entire pro career for the Ravens.

Boulware was a Republican candidate for the Florida House of Representatives in the 2008 general election.

Early career
Boulware was born in Columbia, South Carolina. He played at Heathwood Hall Episcopal School, and then graduated first from Spring Valley High School, and went on to play for Florida State University. He was an all-state pick for Spring Valley High School in 1992. He recorded 132 tackles, 14 sacks, and two blocked punts and was named one of the top 50 athletes in the nation by The Atlanta Journal-Constitution. He was also named one of the nation's top 100 athletes by the Dallas Morning News.

College career
Boulware accepted an athletic scholarship to attend Florida State University, where he played for coach Bobby Bowden's Florida State Seminoles football team from 1993 to 1996. He redshirted his freshman season in 1993; as a redshirt freshman in 1994, he recorded 37 tackles, five sacks, and five tackles for loss. One of his sacks was recorded against Florida Gators quarterback Danny Wuerffel in the 1995 Sugar Bowl.

As a sophomore, Boulware totaled 46 tackles, an ACC-leading ten sacks, and 18 tackles for losses, which ranked second in the ACC, and was named honorable mention All-ACC. As a junior, Boulware totaled 68 tackles, a school record 19 sacks, 20 tackles for losses, seven forced fumbles, and three fumble recoveries. He was a consensus first-team All-American, All-ACC, ACC Defensive Player of the Year, as well as National Defensive Player of the Year by Football News. His 19 sacks were the most in the nation. Boulware decided to enter the 1997 NFL Draft. Boulware graduated on April 26, 1997, with a degree in management information systems.

Boulware was one of six defensive ends selected to Sports Illustrated's all-20th century college football team.

Professional career
The Baltimore Ravens selected Boulware in the first round, with the fourth overall pick in the 1997 NFL Draft.  In 1997 Boulware recorded 66 total tackles, 11.5 sacks, and one forced fumble to receive the NFL Defensive Rookie of the Year by the Associated Press. He would play for the Ravens for eight years, going to four Pro Bowls and becoming the Ravens' all-time sack leader, a title he held until he was surpassed by Terrell Suggs in 2011. Boulware was also a member of the Baltimore Ravens' Super Bowl-winning team during the 2000 NFL season. The Ravens released Peter Boulware prior to the 2005 season, then re-signed him to a lower salary. Before the 2006 season, the Ravens released him again due to injuries and he decided to retire. Boulware finished his career with 493 tackles, a franchise record 70 sacks, 26.5 tackles for losses, 13 forced fumbles, five fumble recoveries, 19 pass deflections, and one interception for six yards in 126 career games.

Personal life
Peter Boulware is married and has five children. He is also the Owner/Managing Partner of a Tallahassee Toyota dealership and is featured in the dealership's commercials.
 He also founded a private school, Community Leadership Academy. His younger brother, Michael Boulware, also played in the NFL.

Honors
Peter Boulware was officially inducted into the Baltimore Ravens' Ring of Honor in a ceremony held during halftime of the game between the Ravens and the Bengals on November 5, 2006.

Politics
On September 10, 2007, Peter Boulware announced his candidacy for the Florida state house as a member of the Republican Party. On August 26, 2008, Boulware won the Republican primary with 84.1 percent of the vote. On November 7, with all ballots counted from the election held on November 4, Democrat Michelle Rehwinkle Vasilinda beat Boulware by 430 votes, for an open Florida House seat.  Following the election Boulware was appointed to the Florida Board of Education by Governor Charlie Crist.

Boulware contributed the federally allowed maximum to the presidential candidacy of Mike Huckabee in the 2008 presidential election primary.

Career statistics

 Pro Bowls: 4
 Played in 111 straight games to start his career before sitting out the final game of the 2003 season due to injury. Sat out all of 2004.
 Baltimore Ravens record for sacks in a season with 15 in 2001.
 Baltimore Ravens team records of 70 sacks for 428 yards lost.
 Totaled 18 tackles and 3 sacks in his 6 career Playoff games.

References

External links
 Peter Boulware Bio
 Peter Boulware for Florida House of Representatives

1974 births
Living people
African-American people in Florida politics
All-American college football players
American Conference Pro Bowl players
American football outside linebackers
Baltimore Ravens players
Florida Republicans
Florida State Seminoles football players
National Football League Defensive Rookie of the Year Award winners
Players of American football from Columbia, South Carolina
21st-century African-American people
20th-century African-American people
Ed Block Courage Award recipients